Parma Associazione Calcio played its sixth consecutive Serie A season, which was the last under legendary coach Nevio Scala, who stepped down at the end of the season. Defensive stalwarts Alberto Di Chiara and Lorenzo Minotti also left the club following the season's conclusion. Despite being only one point behind third-placed Lazio, Parma finished 6th in the standings. In contrast to the previous four seasons, Parma did not win any cups either. The most significant moment of Parma's season was the debut of the club's new superstar, 17-year-old goalkeeper Gianluigi Buffon, who saved a penalty on his debut against A.C. Milan.

Players

Squad information

Transfers

Winter

Competitions

Serie A

League table

Results summary

Results by round

Matches

Coppa Italia

UEFA Cup Winners' Cup

First round

Second round

Quarter-finals

Supercoppa Italiana

Statistics

Players statistics

Goalscorers
  Gianfranco Zola 10
  Hristo Stoichkov 5
  Dino Baggio 4
  Alessandro Melli 4
  Antonio Benarrivo 3

References

Parma Calcio 1913 seasons
Parma